Akanksha Salunkhe, also known as Akanksha Hemant Salunkhe (born 24 January 1999 in Satara), is an Indian professional squash player. As of April 2022, she was ranked number 99 in the world.

References

1999 births
Living people
Indian female squash players